Amadou Touré (born September 27, 1982) is a Burundian-Burkinabé former footballer who last played in Luxembourg.

Career
The Burundi-born Touré began his career 1999 at USFRAN at Bobo Dioulasso in First ligue before joining ASFA. He played two years by ASFA Yennega and moved than to France club Tours FC. At Tours scored 3 goals in 6 games and joined in July 2003 to R.A.E.C. Mons, the club represented three years, then joined in the Promotion and signed a contract by KFC Willebroek-Meerhof in 2006. Amadou stays here for two and a half year and joined than on 9 December 2008 to R.O.C. de Charleroi-Marchienne.

International
He was part of the Burkinabé team which finished bottom of their group both in the 2002 African Nations Cup and the 2004 African Nations Cup.

Sources
 Footgoal Profile
 
 FIFA Profile

References

1979 births
Burkinabé footballers
Burkinabé expatriate footballers
Burkina Faso international footballers
Living people
ASFA Yennenga players
Tours FC players
R.A.E.C. Mons players
R. Olympic Charleroi Châtelet Farciennes players
Belgian Pro League players
Expatriate footballers in France
Expatriate footballers in Belgium
Expatriate footballers in Luxembourg
2002 African Cup of Nations players
2004 African Cup of Nations players
Sportspeople from Bujumbura
Association football defenders
21st-century Burkinabé people